is a 2019 Japanese animated romantic fantasy film produced by CoMix Wave Films and distributed by Toho. It depicts a high school boy who runs away from his rural home to Tokyo and befriends an orphan girl who has the ability to control the weather. The film was commissioned in 2018, written and directed by Makoto Shinkai.

It features the voices of Kotaro Daigo and Nana Mori, with animation direction by Atsushi Tamura, character design by Masayoshi Tanaka, and its orchestral score and soundtrack composed by Radwimps; the latter two previously collaborated with Shinkai on Your Name (2016). A light novel of the same name, also written by Shinkai, was published a day prior the film's premiere, while a manga adaptation was serialized in Afternoon on July 25, 2019.

Weathering with You was theatrically released in conventional, IMAX, and 4DX theaters in Japan on July 19, 2019, and was released in the United States on January 20, 2020. It received positive reviews, with praise for the animation, narrative, music, visuals, and emotional weight, although some reviewers were divided over perceived similarities to Your Name. The film grossed US$193.8 million worldwide, becoming the highest grossing Japanese film of 2019, and the seventh highest-grossing anime film of all time, unadjusted for inflation.

The film won a number of awards, including being selected as the Japanese entry for Best International Feature Film at the 92nd Academy Awards. It received four Annie Award nominations, including for Best Independent Animated Feature, tying Spirited Away and Millennium Actress (both 2001) for the most nominations for an anime film at the Annies (until it was surpassed by Hosoda's Belle (2021), with five nominations). It was screened at the 2022 Japanese Film Festival (JFF) hosted by the Japan Foundation in India to promote cultural exchange.

Plot

In June 2021, first year high schooler Hodaka Morishima escapes Kōzu-shima in order to get away from his troubled home life to Tokyo. When his ferry to the city is hit by a rainstorm, he is saved by Keisuke Suga. As Hodaka becomes broke and struggles to find work, he meets Hina Amano, an employee of a McDonald's restaurant, who takes pity on him and gives him food. Hodaka later finds an abandoned Makarov PM handgun. Suga hires him as his assistant at a small occult magazine publishing company, there they investigate urban legends related to the unusually rainy weather in Tokyo. They hear the legend of "sunshine girls" who can control the weather. Hodaka sees Hina being intimidated into working at a club. He scares off the club owners by firing his gun into the air. Hina takes him to Yoyogi Kaikan, an abandoned building with a shrine on the roof, where he throws the gun away. Hina shocks him by demonstrating her ability to clear the sky by praying. Hina lives alone with her brother Nagi, and they have no adult guardian. Seeing how they are also in financial trouble, Hodaka proposes to start a business together: a job to clear the weather for events like weddings and parties. Their business becomes a success but when Hina is shown on television, their site gets flooded with requests so they decide to close.

Police search for Hodaka, as his family filed a missing person report. They find Hodaka using the gun on a security camera. Officers arrive at Hina's apartment and interrogate her; Hina realizes that because they have no legal guardians, social services are going to separate her and Nagi. Suga, having also been visited by the police, fires Hodaka, explaining that police suspect him of kidnapping him. Hodaka, Hina and Nagi try to run away but are halted by the worsening weather. They take shelter in a hotel. Hina reveals that her body is slowly turning into water the more she uses her power. Bringing sunshine will cause her to disappear, although after that the weather will return to normal. The next morning, Hina has vanished and the rain has stopped. The police track Hodaka to the hotel. Nagi is sent to the children's counseling center and Hodaka to the police station. Having fallen in love with Hina, Hodaka decides to bring her back to Earth and escapes from custody with the help of Suga's niece Natsumi. The police surround Hodaka, but Suga, inspired by Hodaka's desperation to see Hina, helps him escape. At the rooftop shrine, Hodaka jumps through the shrine gate and is transported into the sky, where he finds Hina, insisting that she let go of her worries about the weather and start living for herself. As soon as they come back, Hina, Hodaka, Natsumi, Nagi, and Suga are all arrested, and the heavy rains resume. Hodaka is sentenced to a three-year probation and sent back home in Kōzu-shima.

Three years later, the rain has been falling without end in Tokyo, submerging much of the city. In the spring of 2024, having finished his probation, Hodaka graduates from high school and returns to Tokyo to start college. He meets with Suga, who has expanded his business. Hodaka finds Hina praying on a street overlooking the drowned city, and they reunite.

Voice cast

Production

On August 2, 2018, Makoto Shinkai announced that he was making a new feature film that would be released the following year. The film staff included Masayoshi Tanaka as character designer, Atsushi Tamura as animation director and Hiroshi Takiguchi as art director. Shinkai tweeted about his admiration for Shikao Suga, and that he "borrowed" the last name for the character Keisuke Suga.

In February 2017, plot development of Weathering with You began, and in April, character design and development started. In July, Shinkai began writing the script of the film. In August, setting development, location scouting and collecting information started. Storyboarding began in October. In May 2018, animation work began, while the development of the rain material in the film started in July. In August, cast audition was held, and art background work started in September. In October, the cast of two protagonists of the film was decided. On December 13, 2018, a press conference was held to reveal the film's first key visual and to announce that it would be released on July 19, 2019. Photoshooting for the film started in January 2019. The first trailer debuted on April 10, exactly 100 days before the premiere. Additional posters of the film and the second trailer was released on May 28. All work was completed by July 7, and the film was ready to be released.

In an interview, Shinkai said, "I thought, 'Should I make my next film so that I don't anger more people, or should I make a movie that angers them further?' And I chose the latter." He also added that he was influenced by the impact of climate change on Japan, particularly the increase in rainfall during the summer months. He revealed that he used both CG and hand drawn animation to depict the rain in the film. The writing process of the story includes getting feedback from the production team, he revealed that he took around six months to write his previous film, Your Name, and another six months for Weathering With You. Shinkai chose a more "supernatural" approach on this film, as opposed to the science-fiction angle he used for Your Name. When asked for the reason of including the characters from Your Name, Shinkai said, "Personally, I wanted to see Taki and Mitsuha again before they met."

Casting
Around 2,000 people auditioned for the roles of the film's two protagonists with Kotaro Daigo and Nana Mori being chosen. Other key roles were filled with returning crew members of Your Name. Daigo and Mori began recording their parts on April 27, 2019.
On May 29, 2019, additional cast was announced: Shun Oguri (Keisuke Suga), Tsubasa Honda (Natsumi), Chieko Baisho (Tomi), Sakura Kiryuu (Nagi Amano), Sei Hiraizumi (Yasui), and Yuki Kaji (Takai).

Music

Like Shinkai's Your Name, Japanese rock band Radwimps wrote and composed the soundtrack and score for the film. It was released worldwide on July 19, 2019, the day of the film's release.  is the film's theme song. It become the top-selling song in the weekly digital single chart of July 15–21. Another song, "Grand Escape (Movie edit) feat. Tōko Miura" from the film ranked second with over 41,000 downloads. The film's soundtrack album won multiple awards, including the Japan Gold Disc Award and the 43rd Japan Academy Film Prize.

Marketing

Producer Genki Kawamura presented a work in process screening on June 14, 2019, at the Annecy International Animation Film Festival in France that was open to industry professionals and students but not the general public. TV Asahi aired footage from the film's opening scene during a reshowing of Shinkai's previous film Your Name on June 30. Before its screening in Japan, Uniqlo launched special t-shirts with designs inspired by Weathering with You and Shinkai's previous anime films. Weathering With You reportedly promoted multiple products and companies including SoftBank Group, Suntory and Baitoru, in television advertisements. During its screening in Japan, many convenience stores such as Lawson, launched food products inspired by the film. Lawson also created a new beverage called Ameiro Jelly Tea, a herbal tea infused with blue flower petals.

Release

Weathering with You was released in Japan on July 19, 2019, at 9 a.m. (JST) by its distributor Toho on 448 screens in 359 theaters across the country. Theaters in Tokyo's Shinjuku and Osaka's Umeda districts, however, premiered the film at midnight, July 18. Weathering with You official website announced on September 20 that the film would be shown in the popular 4DX and MX4D formats throughout Japan from September 27. The film was produced by Genki Kawamura with the production company CoMix Wave Films and Story Inc. On July 16, it was announced that the film would be released worldwide; releases had already been decided for 140 countries in North America, Europe, Asia, and South America, exceeding the 135 for Your Name.

In Asia, EDKO Films released the film in Hong Kong on August 8, Encore Films streamed a Malay, Chinese, and English-subtitled trailer and announced and released the film in few Southeast Asia countries including; Indonesia on August 21, Vietnam on August 30, Malaysia & Brunei on September 5 and Singapore on September 12. Pioneer Films announced and released the movie in the Philippines on August 17 for an advanced screening in SM Megamall and August 28 for general release. Producer Genki Kawamura said they want to release it in India because 53,000 people signed a petition requesting its release there. On August 10, director Makoto Shinkai and the official page of Weathering with You announced through Twitter the film would be screened in 20 Indian cities including Mumbai and Delhi from October 11, 2019. PVR Pictures and Bookmyshow-backed theater-on-demand platform Vkaao distributed the film. It was the first mature Japanese animated film to be screened theatrically in India. CJ CGV premiered in South Korea on October 30. Volga Film Company has confirmed it would release the film in Russia on October 31. Thai film distributor Major Group announced the film would open in Thailand on November 7, 2019, but was changed to September 5, 2019. The film has been approved by Beijing's censors and hit Chinese theaters on November 1.

In North America, GKIDS announced that it had acquired the rights of the film and screened an awards-qualifying run in 2019, followed by a theatrical release with Japanese and English-language options on January 17, 2020. The 44th Toronto International Film Festival, which was held from September 5 to 15 in 2019, hosted the North American premiere of the film. As part of the "Special Presentation" category, it is eligible to compete for the People's Choice award. Reportedly Fathom Events released the film in theaters in the United States on January 15 and 16 as a "Special Fan Preview" with special bonus content. GKIDS screened the film in the US at Animation Is Film Festival on October 18, 2019, with Makoto Shinkai in attendance. GKIDS also screened it at Anime NYC 2019 on November 17, 2019 as the east coast premiere. It additionally received a one-week IMAX and 4DX showing.

In Europe, the 67th San Sebastián International Film Festival in Spain hosted the European premiere of the film from September 20 to 28 2019. Anime Limited acquired the UK and Ireland rights of the film, premiering the film at Scotland Loves Anime on October 12, 2019, with a theatrical run in Japanese and English-language options from January 17, 2020. In Italy, Dynit and Nexo Digital released the film theatrically on October 14, 2019. Selecta Visión has licensed it in Spain and screened the film on November 29, 2019. In France, the film was released on January 8, 2020 by Anime Limited and BAC Films. In Germany, the film was released on January 16, 2020 by Universum Film. In Portugal, the film was released on February 20, 2020 by Big Picture Films.

In Australia and New Zealand, Madman Entertainment acquired the rights of the film and began screening it theatrically from August 22, 2019, with encore screenings of the English dub from February 13, 2020.

In the Middle East, Front Row Filmed Entertainment announced that the film will be released on September 10, 2020.

Home media
The film was released on Blu-ray in Japan on May 27, 2020. A collectors edition included a 4K UHD Disc with English and Chinese subtitles. The film was released digitally in North America on August 4, 2020, with a subsequent release on Blu-ray and DVD on September 15, 2020, and a limited edition 4K UHD following on November 17, 2020. This film is currently streaming on HBO Max, a streaming service by AT&T's WarnerMedia.

In Japan, the film sold  physical home video units in twelve days by 7 June 2020, including 111,403 Blu-ray units and 46,347 DVD units. In the United States, the film grossed  from Blu-ray and DVD sales, . In the United Kingdom, where it was the first anime to receive a 4K home video release, it was 2020's second best-selling foreign language film on physical home video formats (just below Parasite).

Reception

Box office
During its initial screening in 359 theaters and 448 screens in Japan, Weathering with You sold 1,159,020 tickets to earn 1,643,809,400 (approx $15.22 million) in its first three days. It was reported that Weathering with You surpassed Shinkai's previous film, Your Name, which earned 1,277,960,000 (about $12.51 million at the time) in its first three days of screening, earning 28.6% more. By August 25, 2019, it had sold eight million tickets and earned 10.73 billion (about $101 million). By September 9, 2019, it had earned 12 billion and became the highest-grossing film of 2019 in Japan. By October 2, 2019, the film had sold over  tickets in Japan, after 75 days on the market. By October 20, 2019, it had sold  tickets and grossed  in Japan. , the film has grossed  in Japan, and became the thirteenth highest-grossing film of all time in Japan.

In China, the film had sold 8,985,208 tickets and grossed  in its first 17 days on the market, by November 19, 2019. By the end of November 2019, the film had grossed  in China. In Singapore, it grossed  and became the highest-grossing anime film in Singapore. In the United States and Canada, the film has grossed $7,798,743, . As of July 2021, the film grossed over  worldwide.

Critical response
Critics have given Weathering with You a generally positive response. The site's critics consensus reads, "Beautifully animated and narratively engaging, Weathering with You further establishes writer-director Makoto Shinkai as a singularly talented filmmaker." On Metacritic, the film has a weighted average score of 72 out of 100 based on reviews from 30 critic reviews, indicating "generally favorable reviews."

Brian Ashcraft of Kotaku praised the film, saying; "in Weathering with You, the connection to real-world weather seems muted and like a missed opportunity. Weather in Japan has long been predictable. But in the past few years, Japanese weather, like weather all over the world, has gotten increasingly strange, relentless and dangerous. In the movie, it’s mentioned how the weather has been changing, but it’s in relation to how spring and summer have become less enjoyable for kids in Japan. There’s nothing about how dangerous this weather has become. And even with the movie shows the power of weather, the impact is underplayed. but later wrote "the biggest problem that Weathering with You has is this: it’s the follow up to Your Name". Daryl Harding, writing for Crunchyroll News, praised the world-building aspect of the film, stating that Shinkai has his finger on the pulse of modern Tokyo's atmosphere, but criticized the similarity between Weathering with You and Your Name. Kim Morrissy of Anime News Network also gave the film a generally positive review, praising its visuals and use of weather to convey the story's metaphor, but criticizing the execution in the second half of the film; she wrote that "Shinkai was evidently constrained by the need to fit his story into a particular template, one that didn't seem to fit the plot this time around". Twwk, reviewing the film for Beneath the Tangles, was mostly positive as well, writing; "The movie isn’t as emotionally powerful as Your Name due to a screenplay that plays too loose (and lazy) to earn its huge moments, but it’s still heartfelt."

Ollie Barder, writing for Forbes, described the animation of Weathering with You as "incredible" and recognized its ability to bring "Tokyo to life in a uniquely palpable way". Later, he praised Shinkai for his way of depicting "wildlife and naturalistic vistas". James Marsh from South China Morning Post praised the film for its animation, but criticized it for its lack of "clarity of vision seen in Your Name". He described the plot as more straightforward than that of Your Name, but said it has some unanswered and "dangling"  plot threads. A review by Alicia Haddick for Otaquest praised the film's attempts to differentiate itself from Makoto Shinkai's past work and praised its animation, story and music, but said that its reliance on the structure of his last film hurt the movie overall, stating that "it's impossible to discuss this film without the specter of Your Name hanging over your shoulder". Andrew Paredes, writing for ABS-CBN News, praised the film's characters, story, themes, and Makoto Shinkai's directing, saying; "The effusive emotion and Shinto mysticism rubbing up nicely against real-world concerns. And then there’s the animation: Shinkai has outdone himself with this follow-up, presenting Tokyo not just with detailed fidelity, but also with a glow that suggests a lush, lambert  inner life." Terence Toh, writing for The Star, praised the film's characters and story, saying; "Weathering With You boasts of wonderful visual and likeable characters. The story is also right as rain."

Awards and nominations
The film was selected Japan's entry for Best International Feature Film at the 92nd Academy Awards, but it failed to make the shortlist. It also received four Annie Award nominations including Best Independent Animated Feature, which makes it the third anime film tying with Spirited Away and Millennium Actress to have four nominations; the highest for an anime film at the Annies. The film won the Best Animated Feature Film award at the 13th Asia Pacific Screen Awards (ASPA) in Brisbane, Australia. It received the Audience Award along with Zabou Breitman and Elea Gobbe-Mevellec's The Swallows of Kabul film at the Animation Is Film Festival in Los Angeles.

Adaptations
A novel adaption, with the same name, was written concurrently with production of the film by the director, Makoto Shinkai. On April 30, 2019, he announced through Twitter that he had finished writing it. It was released in print and in digital format by Kadokawa Sneaker Bunko on July 18, 2019. More than 99,000 copies were sold in the first week and it took first place in the Oricon weekly library ranking on July 29. By August 16, 318,000 copies were sold, making it the first novel in the library this year to exceed 300,000 sales. By September 10, it sold over 650,000 copies in successive editions. On October 24, 2019, Yen Press announced that they had licensed the novel for North American release, in print and in digital format, on December 17.

In addition, a children's book adaptation for children, elementary school and junior high school students, was released on August 9, 2019. It sold 13,000 copies in the first week and took first place in the "Children's Books" genre in Oricon weekly library ranking.

A manga adaptation drawn by Watari Kubota began serialization on July 25, 2019, in Kodansha's Monthly Afternoon magazine. It was announced that the manga would have a colored opening page. The manga finished on August 25, 2020.

Gallery

See also
 List of highest-grossing animated films
 List of highest-grossing anime films
 List of highest-grossing films in Japan

References

External links

  
  at CoMix Wave Films
 
 
 
 
 
 

2019 animated films
2019 films
Japanese animated feature films
2019 anime films
Animated teen films
Anime with original screenplays
CoMix Wave Films films
Films about orphans
Films about runaways
Films about weather hazards
Films directed by Makoto Shinkai
Films with screenplays by Makoto Shinkai
Films set in 2021
Films set in 2024
Films set in Tokyo
IMAX films
Japan Academy Prize for Animation of the Year winners
Japanese animated fantasy films
Japanese teen films
Novels set in Tokyo
Toho animated films
4DX films